John Withals (d. circa 1555) was an English lexicographer. Withals was born and raised in London.  Originally a schoolmaster, he was a contemporary of Peter Levens and Richard Huloet.

Withals was the author of one of the first English-Latin vocabularies for children. In 1556, he published A Short Dictionary for Young Beginners.

References

External links
 
 

British lexicographers
Year of birth missing
Year of death missing